Rattray may refer to:

People
Rattray (surname)

Places in Scotland
Rattray, Aberdeenshire, near Crimond, Aberdeenshire
Rattray Head, headland in Buchan, Aberdeenshire
 "Rattray Briggs", the historical name for the rocks at Rattray Head
 "Rattray Bay", to the north of Rattray Head
Rattray, Perth and Kinross, a settlement in Blairgowrie and Rattray twin burgh